JIS may refer to:

Standards
 Japanese Industrial Standards
 JIS screw drive
 JIS semiconductor designation
 JIS encoding
 Shift JIS

Organisations
 Japanese international school
 Jabriya Indian School, Kuwait
 Jakarta International School, Indonesia
 Jamaica Information Service
 Jeddah International School, Saudi Arabia
 Jerudong International School, Brunei
 JIS University, India
 JIS College of Engineering, India

Other uses
 Jakarta International Stadium, stadium in Jakarta
 Juggling Information Service, a website
 Just in sequence, an inventory strategy
 Journal of Integer Sequences